Rebih is a surname. Notable people with the surname include:

Aboubaker Rebih (born 1983), Algerian footballer
Krimo Rebih (1932–2012), Algerian footballer